Yulia Emelyanova is a Ukrainian football player, currently playing as a striker for Voskhod Stara Mayachka in Ukrainian High League. She previously played for Energiya Voronezh and ShVSM Izmailovo in the Russian Championship.

She was a member of the Ukrainian national team.

References

1987 births
Living people
Women's association football forwards
Ukrainian women's footballers
Sportspeople from Kherson
Ukraine women's international footballers
Ukrainian expatriate women's footballers
Ukrainian expatriate sportspeople in Russia
Expatriate women's footballers in Russia
CSP Izmailovo players
FC Energy Voronezh players